Tertiary Highway 811, commonly referred to as Highway 811, is the longest of Ontario's tertiary highways, and the highest posted route number in the province. The route encounters no named roads along its route, aside from its eastern terminus at Secondary Highway 527. It extends  westward into the wilderness, ending at a bridge over the Weaver River. The route was designated in 1976 with the intention of extending it further west, but this extension has yet to be constructed.

Route description 
Branching off from Secondary Highway 527, roughly halfway between Thunder Bay and Armstrong, Highway 811 is Ontario's highest numbered route, but also one of its most remote. Aside from its beginning, the highway connects with no named roads along its length.
It zig-zags northwestward for  towards Savant Lake, although as of 2011 the road reaches less than halfway there. It crosses several small rivers as it travels through the Boreal Forest before ending at a bridge over the Weaver River, south of Obonga-Ottertooth Provincial Park.
The road is gravel for its entire length. There are no communities along Highway 811; it is almost exclusively used for wilderness travel or forest operations.

History 
As part of the 1974 Ontario Highway Capital Construction Program, the Ministry of Transportation and Communications studied the potential benefit of a road connecting Highway 527 southwest of Lake Nipigon with Highway 599 near Savant Lake. A forest road that branched off from Highway 527 was assumed as Highway 811 in 1976. However, the planned connection to Highway 599 has yet to occur, and an  gap separates Savant Lake from the Weaver River.
Despite no connection materializing over the past 35 years, and no plans to construct that connection presently, Highway 811 remains a signed and maintained provincial highway.

Major intersections

References

External links 

 Google Maps: Highway 811

Roads in Thunder Bay District
811